Laredo is a city in and the county seat of Webb County, Texas, United States, on the north bank of the Rio Grande in South Texas, across from Nuevo Laredo, Tamaulipas, Mexico. Laredo has the distinction of flying seven flags (the flag of the former Republic of the Rio Grande, which is now the flag of the city, in addition to the Six Flags of Texas). 

Founded in 1755, Laredo grew from a village to the capital of the short-lived Republic of the Rio Grande to the largest inland port on the Mexican border. Laredo's economy is primarily based on international trade with the United States largest trading partner Mexico, and as a major hub for three areas of transportation - land, rail, and air cargo. The city is on the southern end of I-35, which connects manufacturers in northern Mexico through Interstate 35 as a major route for trade throughout the U.S. It has four international bridges and one railway bridge.

According to the 2020 census, the city's population was 255,205, making it the 11th-most populous city in Texas and third-most populated U.S. city on the Mexican border, after San Diego, California and El Paso, Texas. Its metropolitan area is the 178th-largest in the 
U.S. and includes all of Webb County, with a population of 267,114. Laredo is also part of the cross-border Laredo-Nuevo Laredo metropolitan area with an estimated population of 636,516.

Laredo is notable for its high Hispanic proportion, which at over 95%, is the highest proportion of Hispanic Americans of any city in the United States outside of Puerto Rico. It is one of the least ethnically diverse cities in the United States. When economic, household, and social diversity are considered, Laredo is the 19th-least diverse of the 313 largest cities in the nation.
Texas A&M International University and Laredo College are in Laredo. Laredo International Airport is within the Laredo city limits, while the Quetzalcoatl International Airport is nearby in Nuevo Laredo on the Mexican side.

The biggest festival, Washington's Birthday Celebration, is held during the later part of January and the majority of February, attracting hundreds of thousands of tourists.

History

 
The Spanish colonial settlement of Villa de San Agustin de Laredo was founded in 1755 by Don Tomás Sánchez Barrera, while the area was part of the Nuevo Santander region in the Spanish viceroyalty of New Spain. Villa de San Agustin de Laredo was named after Laredo, Cantabria, Spain and in honor of Saint Augustine of Hippo. In 1840, Laredo was the capital of the independent Republic of the Rio Grande, set up in opposition to Antonio López de Santa Anna; it was brought back into Mexico by military force.

In 1846 during the Mexican–American War, the town was occupied by the Texas Rangers. After the war, the Treaty of Guadalupe-Hidalgo ceded the land to the United States. A referendum was taken in the town, which voted to petition the American military government in charge of the area to return the town to Mexico. When this petition was rejected, many who had been in the area for generations, moved across the river into Mexican territory, where they founded Nuevo Laredo. Many others, especially original land grantees on the north side of the Rio Grande remained, becoming Texans in the process. In 1849, the United States Army set up Fort McIntosh (originally Camp Crawford). Laredo was rechartered as a city in 1852.

Laredo is one of the oldest crossing points along the Mexico–United States border, and the nation's largest inland port of entry. In 2005, Laredo celebrated the 250th anniversary of its founding.

The etymology of the name for the Spanish town of Laredo is unclear. Some scholars say the name stems from glaretum, which means "sandy, rocky place". Others state Laredo stems from a Basque word meaning "beautiful pastures". Laredo might also stem from the Latin larida, which means gull.

In 1946, the Plaza Theater opened in downtown Laredo, but it closed in 1999, when the municipal government purchased the property from United Artists. In 2001, the Laredo City Council authorized a feasibility study to determine what use the old theater might yet have. In 2003, a consultant recommended converting the Plaza into a multipurpose performing-arts center, with dance recitals, concerts, live theater, and occasional films. In 2006, the city received an economic development grant for renovation of the Plaza. By 2008, renovations were made to the theater marquee and blade design. In 2011, a public-private partnership was attempted by two Laredo businessmen, Danny Lopez Jr. and Victor Trevino Jr., but that initiative never materialized. In 2018, the city council authorized the solicitation of private entities and nonprofit organizations to operate the theater. The council is also seeking input from architects for the concept and design of renovations to the structure.

Cellist Yo-Yo Ma brought his Bach Project to the Juarez–Lincoln International Bridge in April 2019.

Geography

According to the United States Census Bureau, the city has a total area of 102.6 square miles (265.7 km), of which 1.5 square miles (3.9 km) (1.37%) are covered by water.

Location
Laredo is on the west end of the Rio Grande Plains, south of the Edwards Plateau, west of the Coastal Plains, and east of the Mexican Mountains. The area consists of a few hills and flat land covered with grasses, oaks, and mesquite.

Bodies of water
Notable geographic features are the Rio Grande and Chacon Creek's man-made reservoir,
Lake Casa Blanca, in Lake Casa Blanca International State Park. The six major creeks are Chacon Creek, San Ildefonso Creek, San Ygnacio Creek, Santa Isabel Creek, Sombrerillito Creek, and Zacate Creek, all of which drain into the Rio Grande. Several man-made reservoirs include the San Ildefonso Creek Lake (second-largest reservoir), and the Sombrerillito Creek Lake (third-largest reservoir).

Nearby cities

Climate
Laredo's climate is semiarid with very hot temperatures in the summer and mild temperatures during the winter. The climate is considered to be hot semiarid (Köppen: BSh). Its weather is affected by the Sierra Madre Oriental mountains to the west, the Gulf of Mexico to the east, and the Chihuahuan Desert of Northern Mexico and West Texas. Moisture from the Pacific is cut off by the Mexican mountain range.

On average, temperatures reach  or higher on 75 days annually, and fall to or below the freezing mark on 5.1 days, although, in five years, the most recent being 2015, the annual minimum temperature was above freezing.

Precipitation averages  annually, with higher amounts typically occurring from May to October.

Demographics

2020 census

As of the 2020 United States census, 255,205 people, 72,328 households, and 58,294 families resided in the city.

2010 census
As of the 2010, Laredo is the 81st-most populous city in the United States and the 10th-largest in Texas. According to the 2010 census there were 236,091 inhabitants in the city.

According to the 2010 U.S. Census, the racial composition of Laredo was:
 Whites: 87.7%, non-Hispanic Whites: 3.86%
 Black or African American: 0.5%
 Native American: 0.4%
 Asian: 0.6%
 Native Hawaiian and Other Pacific Islander: 0.00%
 Two or more races: 1.5%
 other races 9.3%
Ethnically, the city was:

 Hispanic or Latino (of any race) – 95.6% (Mexican 86.9%, Puerto Rican 0.4%, Cuban 0.1%, other Hispanic or Latino 8.3%)

According to respondents' self-identification on the 2010 Census, the vast majority of Laredo's population is of Hispanic origin (95.6%), mostly Mexican (86.9%). Most Hispanics who did not identify themselves as Mexican identified as "other Hispanic or Latino" (8.3% of the total population). About 84.3% of the population identifies as white Hispanic, while only 11.3% identifies as Hispanic but not white; 4.4% of the population was not Hispanic or Latino (3.4% non-Hispanic White, 0.2% non-Hispanic Black or African American, 0.6% non-Hispanic Asian, 0.1% from some other race (non-Hispanic), and 0.1% of two or more races (non-Hispanic)).

The 2005 estimate listed 99,675 males and 108,112 females. The average household contained 3.69 occupants. The population density was 2,250.5 people per square mile (868.9/km).

Of the 60,816 households, 56,247 or 92.5% were occupied: 33,832 were owner-occupied units and 22,415 were renter-occupied units. About 62.0% were married couples living together, 18.7% had a female householder with no husband present, and 14.7% were not families. Around 12.7% of all households were made up of individuals, and 5.2% had someone living alone who was 65 or older. The average household size was 3.69, and the average family size was 4.18.

The city's population is distributed as 35.5% under the age of 18, 11.4% from 18 to 24, 29.5% from 25 to 44, 15.8% from 45 to 64, and 7.8% who were 65 years of age or older. The median age was 27 years. For every 100 females, there were 92.2 males. For every 100 females age 18 and over, there were 87.2 males.

The median income for a household in the city was $32,019, and for a family was $32,577. The per capita income for the city was $12,269; 29.2% of families were below the poverty line.

According to the United States Census Bureau, at a 2000 census, Laredo was the second-fastest growing city in the United States, after Las Vegas.

In 2016, Laredo was ranked the safest city in Texas for motorists and the 14th-safest nationally. Its average annual car insurance rate is $1,515.76; the average years between accidents is 11.7.

In 2016, the violent crime rate in Laredo dropped to 379 per 100,000 inhabitants, according to AreaVibes. The violent crime rate in Dallas was 694 per 100,000 inhabitants. In Houston, it was 967 per 100,000 inhabitants.

Economy

South Texas banking institutions in Laredo include Falcon International Bank, International Bank of Commerce, and Texas Community Bank.

Laredo is the largest inland port in the United States, and Nuevo Laredo the largest in Latin America. This is due to their respective locations, served by Interstate Highway 35 / Mexican Federal Highway 85, the effects of NAFTA, dozens of twin assembly plants on the Mexican side, and dozens of import export agencies to expedite trade. In January 2014, the Laredo customs district processed "$20 billion in two-way trade with Mexico", about half that for the entire US with Mexico for the month. Laredo is a shopping destination for Mexican shoppers from Northern Mexico. In 2015, the San Antonio Express-News reported the number of Mexican shoppers has declined due to drug war-related violence in Nuevo Laredo.

Trade

More than 47% of United States international trade headed for Mexico and more than 36% of Mexican international trade crosses through the Laredo port of entry. Laredo's economy revolves around commercial and industrial warehousing, import, and export. As a major player in international trade, the Laredo area benefited from passage of the North American Free Trade Agreement, which has encouraged trade. The Laredo port of entry consists of four international bridges (with a proposed fifth one) crossing the Rio Grande into the Mexican states of Tamaulipas and Nuevo León.

Retail sales

Retail sales attract shoppers from Northern Mexico and South Texas. There is one indoor shopping mall in Laredo, Mall del Norte, The Outlet Shoppes at Laredo, and another has not progressed past planning: Laredo Town Center, part of downtown redevelopment. There are dozens of shopping centers. The Streets of Laredo Urban Mall is an association created by businesses on Iturbide Street in the San Agustin historical district to beautify and renovate the area, which has a pedestrian scale.
Mall Del Norte 
The Outlet Shoppes at Laredo,  owned by Horizon Group Properties, opened March 2017 with as many as seventy-seven stores, including Banana Republic, Tommy Hilfiger, Michael Kors, Brooks Brothers, OshKosh B'Gosh, Old Navy, New York and Company, and Kay Jewelers.
Streets of Laredo Urban Mall

Labor market information

As of October 2007, Laredo's labor market was in the following industries by percentage of number employed: Trade, Transportation, and Utilities (32%), Information (1%), Financial Activity (5%), Professional and Business Services (6%), Education and Health Services (15%), Leisure and Hospitality (10%), Government (23%), Mining and Construction (5%), Manufacturing (2%), and Other Services (2%).

Laredo has increased the number of nonagricultural jobs from 55,100 in January 1996 to 86,600 in October 2007. Laredo has had a higher job growth rate (2%–6.5%) than the state as a whole because of expanded international trade through NAFTA. In 2007, Laredo experienced a job growth rate of 2.5%. As of October 2007, the Laredo unemployment rate was 4.1% or 3,700 unemployed persons, as compared to 3.9% in Texas statewide. This is a significant drop since the mid-1990s, when Laredo's unemployment was over 15%.

Laredo has had positive job market growth since the mid-1990s; setbacks in the mining (oil/gas) industry shifted a few thousand workers to other industries such as international trade and construction. Many large employers in the oil and gas industries shut down operations in Laredo and across Texas, and shifted to foreign countries. The same effect occurred in the garment industry (Levis and Haggar) along the Texas border area. Laredo lost its only garment-producing company (Barry), costing the jobs of about 300 workers. Laredo's strong job growth rate in retail and transportation services limited the adverse effects of long-term unemployment from the few massive layoffs of the late 1990s. Laredo's success with international trade is also a vulnerability; it depends on changes to Mexico's economy, that status of immigration laws (along with daily border crossings: shoppers and commercial trade), and terrorism.

Top employers

Agriculture 
Laredo is a major center for the cattle ranching in the state. Cattle here suffer from the cattle fever tick, Rhipicephalus microplus (syn. Boophilus microplus). Researchers and ranchers are concerned about pyrethroid resistance developing and spreading here, as it has in nearby areas of the state and neighboring Tamaulipas state. Because the situation is so severe, the main office of the country's  is located here. This program is operated by USDA APHIS. The  of this tick was collected here by Davey et al., 1980 and is now a commonly used laboratory strain negative for pyrethroid resistance.

Arts and culture

Annual celebrations

The Washington's Birthday Celebration, a month-long event that celebrates George Washington's birthday, is the largest annual celebration of its kind in the United States, with 400,000 attendees. It was founded in 1898 by the Improved Order of Red Men, local chapter Yaqui Tribe No. 59. The first celebration was a success, and its popularity grew rapidly; in 1923, it received its state charter. In 1924, the celebration held its first colonial pageant, which featured 13 girls from Laredo, representing the 13 original colonies. The celebration includes parades, a carnival, an air show, fireworks, live concerts, and a citywide prom during which many of Laredo's elite dress in very formal attire. The related Jalapeño Festival is one of the United States' top 10 eating festivals.

Jamboozie is held in late January in downtown Laredo as part of the Washington's birthday celebrations. Similar to New Orleans' Mardi Gras, the Jamboozie is a colorful event, with many people dressed in beads, masks, and flamboyant outfits.

Museums

The Republic of the Rio Grande Museum is in the downtown historical district next to the historic La Posada Hotel. What was once the Capitol building now showcases memorabilia from the short lived Republic of the Rio Grande. It displays pictures, books, and furniture from the 19th century Laredo area, and offers guided tours for school-aged children and adults year-round. Because of this Republic, Laredo had flown seven flags instead of the traditional Six Flags over Texas.

The Laredo Center for the Arts is located in downtown Laredo. The building houses three galleries: the Goodman Gallery, the Laredo Art League Gallery and the Lilia G. Martinez Gallery. The Center for the Arts, in the former City Hall offices known as "The Mercado", displays regional artwork and provides community events for children and adults. The Laredo Little Theater provides Laredo with live stage performances. The theater also hosts comedians.

Imaginarium of South Texas (formerly Laredo Children's Museum), in Mall del Norte, provides a hands-on experience with science, technology, and art for Laredo's youth. A second museum is planned on the Texas A&M International University campus.

The Nuevo Santander Museum Complex is composed of restored buildings of Fort McIntosh, a historical collection of photographs of the fort, the main guardhouse, which has World War I (1914–1918) memorabilia, and a science and technology museum.

Planetarium

The Lamar Bruni Vergara Science Center Planetarium is on the Texas A&M International University campus. The planetarium surrounds audiences in a dome with an accurate image of the night sky showing all the motions and cycles of the Sun, Moon, planets, and constellations in the sky.

Library

The Joe A. Guerra Laredo Public Library was first housed on the second floor of the City Hall, now known as the Market Hall, in 1916. In 1974, the Laredo Public Library moved to the historic Bruni Plaza in downtown Laredo. In 1993, the citizens of Laredo approved the construction of a new main library at McPherson and Calton Roads, which opened on February 1, 1998. On July 22, 2016, the structure was named in honor of Joe A. Guerra, a former member of the Laredo City Council known for his support for the library and a personal passion for reading. Council member Roque Vela, who first proposed the structure be named for Guerra, described the former councilman, who died in 2010, as "someone I looked up to for his unwavering commitment to public service. I am especially proud to know the library and reading were passions of Mr. Guerra." The main library is in central Laredo; the Bruni Plaza Branch is downtown east of Washington Street, and the Santo Niño Branch is in south Laredo.

Two new libraries opened in 2014, one in northwest Laredo, the Fasken Library on March 14, and another in the south sometime in July.

Nightlife

The city is populated with both adult and family entertainment, such as bars, nightclubs, sports fields, movie theaters, family restaurants, and other entertainment venues.

Churches and architecture

Most of Laredo's architecture is of Spanish Colonial, American, and Mexican flavor. Most of Laredo's Spanish Colonial-style buildings are in downtown Laredo. More modern American architecture can be seen along Interstate Highway 35, as well as in the downtown area.

Heavily Roman Catholic in church affiliation, Laredo has impressive houses of worship. The oldest congregation, now San Agustin Cathedral, on the downtown historic plaza, dates to the founding of the city in 1755. The striking building seen today was begun in 1871. Our Lady of Guadalupe is an imposing structure in Romanesque Revival Lombard (North Italian) style. It was designed by Leo M. J. Dielmann of San Antonio, a popular architect of Catholic buildings, and built for a Mexican-American and Hispanic congregation in the inner city, at San Jorge Avenue and Callaghan St. Dielmann was commissioned by church authorities to design churches for similar congregations in Houston and San Antonio. He also did the San Agustin parish school, and may have had a hand in the San Agustin church, itself.

Both the First United Methodist Church, in 1949, and the Christ Church Episcopal, were designed by Henry Steinbomer, a popular and prolific San Antonio architect who is credited with more than 100 churches and related buildings during the 1940s and 50s, from the Lower Rio Grande Valley mostly in South and West Texas, from the Sacred Heart Cathedral in San Angelo to Union Church in Monterrey, Mexico.

Other Laredo churches include Baptist, Presbyterian, Lutheran, Assembly of God, Mormon, and nondenominational congregations.

National Register of Historic Places sites

Barrio Azteca Historic District 
Fort McIntosh 
San Agustin de Laredo Historic District 
Hamilton Hotel, architects Atlee B. Ayers and Robert Ayers, the tallest building in Laredo
U.S. Post Office, Court House, and Custom House
Webb County Courthouse, finished 1909 to designs in the Beaux-Arts style by renowned architect Alfred Giles

List of the tallest buildings

Laredo in multimedia

Film and television

Streets of Laredo is a 1949 Western film starring William Holden, Macdonald Carey, and William Bendix as three outlaws who rescue a young girl, played by Mona Freeman. When they become separated, two reluctantly become Texas Rangers, while the third continues on a life of crime.

In the 1957 Christmas episode entitled "Laredo" of NBC's Western series, Tales of Wells Fargo, series character Jim Hardie (Dale Robertson) must track gunrunners across the United States/Mexican border, a quest which keeps him from spending the holiday with friends in Laredo as he had intended. The episode stars Henry Rowland, Rodolfo Hoyos Jr., Karl Swenson and Pierre Watkin.

In 1958, ABC aired the second episode, "Ambush in Laredo", of the 17-part miniseries, Texas John Slaughter.

The 1959 Western film, Gunmen from Laredo, stars Robert Knapp, Walter Coy, Paul Birch, and Ron Hayes in the story of a man seeking revenge for the murder of his wife. He winds up in prison on a false murder charge, but the marshal allows him to escape to pursue the man who killed his wife.

In the episode "Cactus Lady" (February 21, 1961) of the NBC Western television series, Laramie, series regular Jess Harper, played by Robert Fuller, is shown to have been nearly hanged by mistake in the border city of Laredo around 1870 because of the McCanles gang, played by Arthur Hunnicutt, L. Q. Jones, Harry Dean Stanton, and Anita Sands. In the storyline, the gang arrives suddenly in Laramie.

From 1965 to 1967, NBC aired an hour-long Western television series entitled, Laredo, with Philip Carey, William Smith, Peter Brown, and Neville Brand. A spin-off of The Virginian, Laredo, with elements of comedy, focuses on Texas Rangers in the border country. It is available on DVD.Laredo was also broadcast on weekdays on the Encore Westerns Channel, having filled the time slot previously occupied by double episodes of the ABC/Warner Bros. series, Lawman, which also co-stars Peter Brown.

The 1983 film Eddie Macon's Run, based on a James McLendon novel, features John Schneider as Eddie Macon, who is wrongly convicted of mostly minor crimes. While performing at a prison rodeo in Huntsville, Texas, he escapes and heads for Laredo, where he hopes to join his family in Mexico. Carl "Buster" Marzack (Kirk Douglas) is a cop in hot pursuit of Eddie. Without transportation, Eddie journeys on foot. He ends up in the woods, where he is nearly killed. He meets Jilly Buck (Lee Purcell), a bored rich girl who agrees to help him.

Lone Star is a 1996 American mystery film written and directed by John Sayles and set in a small town in Texas. The ensemble cast features Chris Cooper, Kris Kristofferson, Matthew McConaughey, and Elizabeth Peña and deals with a sheriff's investigation into the murder of one of his predecessors. The movie was filmed in Del Rio, Eagle Pass, and Laredo.

The 2011 series, Bordertown: Laredo, is a 10-episode documentary on the Arts and Entertainment Network based on the work of the narcotics unit of the Laredo Police Department.

Music

Laredo has been the subject of several songs in popular culture. One of the most popular songs is the "Streets of Laredo", originally known as "A Cowboy's Lament" and written by Frank H. Maynard, who lived mostly in Colorado. It has been recorded by artists such as Johnny Cash, Marty Robbins, Waylon Jennings, John Cale, Roy Rogers, and Prefab Sprout (who also made a lyrical reference to Laredo in an early song, "Cue Fanfare"), and is even featured in a Charlie's Angels episode ("Pretty Angels all in a Row", season two, episode three). On October 28, 1958, in the episode "The Ghost" of the ABC/WB Western series, Sugarfoot, "The Streets of Laredo" is performed by child actor Tommy Rettig.

The first song on Marty Robbins' 1966 LP The Drifter was "Meet Me Tonight in Laredo". The song described a young Comanchero who woos a young woman despite her family's disapproval. The couple leaves Laredo together to start a new life in the Sierre Madre mountains.

From 1959 to 1972, the six-member singing group, The Rondels, dominated the musical scene in Laredo. Carlos Saenz Landin, the lead singer, left the group to work for the Dallas Independent School District, but years later returned to Laredo. Lead guitarist Humberto Donovan served in the United States Marine Corps. The late Roberto Alonzo played the bass guitar. Sammy Ibarra, played the keyboard and composed the song, "Lo Mucho Que Te Quiero (The More I Love You)." He subsequently became a pastor. Singer Noe Adolfo Esparza pursued a college career and became a supervisor for Southwestern Bell Telephone Company. As of 2017, he was still performing with the oldies group, Los Fabulosos in Laredo. Joe Lee Vera served in the United States Navy and played drums for The Rondels. Several of Vera's brothers were drummers too. The Rondels packed the Laredo Civic Center Auditorium. Two other songs characteristic of the group are "Ya-Ya" and "All Night Worker". With their disbanding, Juan Cisneros of Laredo recalls The Rondels "left a large void that will never be forgotten."

Sports

Current teams

Laredo Heat

The Laredo Heat is a United Soccer Leagues Premier Development League team. The team's home stadium is the Texas A&M International University Soccer Complex. The team was founded in 2004. In the 2006 season, the Laredo Heat finished runner-up, yet made it only to the first round of the Open Cup. In the 2007 season, the Laredo Heat were the Southern Conference champions and won the PDL championship. The Heat were on hiatus for the 2016 and 2017 seasons. In November 2017, the Heat announced they will be an expansion team of the National Premier Soccer League in 2018. The Heat recently announced they will also be joining the United Premier Soccer League for the 2020 season.

Tecolotes de los Dos Laredos

The Tecolotes de los Dos Laredos (Owls of the Two Laredos) are a Mexican League baseball team based in Nuevo Laredo, Tamaulipas, Mexico. The team splits their home schedule between Parque la Junta in Nuevo Laredo and Uni-Trade Stadium in Laredo.

Defunct teams

Laredo Honey Badgers

The Laredo Honey Badgers were a proposed professional indoor soccer team that was founded in April 2013, expected to make its debut in the Professional Arena Soccer League with the 2013–2014 season. The team was to play its home games at the Laredo Energy Arena. The official name and colors (black and chrome) of the team were decided with fan participation. However, after several delays the team postponed its launch and eventually ceased operations.

Laredo Lemurs

The Laredo Lemurs, a professional baseball team, played their first season in the independent American Association in 2012 with home games at Uni-Trade Stadium. They won the South Division in their inaugural season, but were eliminated in the first playoff round. The Lemurs won the league championship in 2015 but ceased operations after the 2016 season.

Laredo Roses

The Laredo Roses were a professional women's full contact football team in the South Texas Sugar N Spice Football League that began play in the 2012 season. The Roses played their home games at the Uni-Trade Stadium. The female players used short-shorts and half-cut jerseys during games.

Laredo Swarm

Laredo Swarm was a semi-professional basketball in the relaunched American Basketball Association. They started playing in 2015 in Laredo Energy Arena. The team was disbanded before the 2017–2018 season.

Stadiums and arenas

Sames Auto Arena

The Sames Auto Arena, is at Loop 20 and Jacaman Road. The Sames Auto Arena was strongly pushed to fruition by former Laredo Mayor Betty Flores. Sames Auto Arena was home to the former Laredo Bucks. The , $36.5 million facility seats 8,002 people for ice hockey and arena football, and up to 10,000 for concerts. It has fourteen luxury suites, four meeting rooms and a private club for two hundred charter members. It was completed in mid-2002 through an increase in the Laredo sales tax of .25 percent. Sports that can be played at the Sames Auto Arena include ice hockey, arena football, indoor soccer, basketball, wrestling, and boxing. The arena has hosted many events such as The Laredo Hunting and Fishing Show, Miss Texas USA, Laredo Home and Garden Show and the South Texas Collectors Exp's Comic Con. Every year, Laredo College, TAMIU, United ISD and Laredo ISD have their graduation ceremonies at the Sames Auto Arena. Well-known artists and bands that have performed in the arena include Lil Wayne, Rihanna, Kesha, Pitbull, Flo Rida, Shakira, Enrique Iglesias, Tool, Aerosmith, Kiss, Elton John, Styx, REO Speedwagon, ZZ Top, Lynyrd Skynyrd, Ricky Martin, George Lopez, T.I., Ludacris, Cher, Hilary Duff, Monster Jam and WWE.

Uni-Trade Stadium

The Uni-Trade Stadium is Laredo's newest baseball field. The stadium is near the Laredo Energy Arena. The project was approved by the city council and was voted in favor of (with 61.32% of the votes in favor 38.68% against) constructing it with money collected since 2004 by a .25 percent sales tax increase. There is a surplus of about $15 million. The stadium was home to the Laredo Lemurs of the independent American Association from 2012 to 2016. Beginning in 2018, the Tecolotes de los Dos Laredos of the Mexican League play half of their home games at the stadium and the other half at Estadio Nuevo Laredo.

Student Activity Complex

United Independent School District's students use the Student Activity Complex on State Highway 359 for football, soccer, and baseball. Opened in the summer of 2002, it has the city's first artificial grass stadium. The SAC was also the home of the Laredo Heat. The capacity is 8,500 spectators.

Texas A&M International University Soccer Complex

Texas A&M International University Soccer Complex (also known as Dustdevil Field and TAMIU Soccer Complex) was built in 2006 and renovated in 2007. The soccer complex is on the Texas A&M International University campus. The complex has two soccer stadiums with a seating capacity of four thousand each. The Dustdevil Field is the new home stadium to the 2007 champion team Laredo Heat member of the United Soccer Leagues Premier Development League (PDL) and the TAMIU Dustdevils women and men's soccer teams member of the Lone Star Conference, NCAA Division II.

Shirley Field

The original Shirley Field was next to the Civic Center and R&T Martin High School on San Bernardo Avenue. It was built in 1937, along with Martin High School. Shirley Field was the location for outdoor athletics for Laredo Independent School District and also hosts the annual Border Olympics events. It seats up to about 6,000 fans with additional seating at the 2 endzones. Professional Mexican soccer teams have played various exhibition games here, noting the real grass allows for "better" soccer games. The various sports played on the stadium are football, soccer and track & field events. Major renovations are slated for this historic stadium. In November 2009 Shirley Field was demolished and was rebuilt by the 2011 football season. The total cost of the reconstruction was $12,000,000 and it now seats 8,000 fans and features artificial turf.

Krueger Field

Krueger Field is in north Laredo and is owned by United Independent School District. The stadium has a capacity of 5,000 and is used to play football and soccer high school games. It is home to United High School's football and soccer teams.

Veterans Field

Veterans Field is a 5,000 seat baseball park which was known as West Martin Field. Major renovation is happening to update the 1950 ball park. Veterans Field was also the home to the five-time champion Mexican Baseball League team Tecolotes de los Dos Laredos from 1985 to 2003. Veterans Field is also home to the Texas A&M International University's Lone Star Conference NCAA Division II Dustdevils baseball team.

Laredo Civic Center

Prior to the construction of the Laredo Energy Arena most major concerts and shows were performed at the Laredo Civic Center. The Laredo Civic Center complex has an auditorium with 1,979 seats and a banquet and exhibit hall with 1,635 seats.

Parks and recreation

Lake Casa Blanca

Lake Casa Blanca International State Park, on Loop 20, has a  artificial lake along with cooking out, camping, picnicking, lake swimming, skiing, boating, and mountain biking. The most popular recreational use of the lake is fishing. A boat ramp and fishing pier is available on the lake's eastern side. The lake is a popular destination for winter Texans. The park was operated by the City of Laredo and Webb County before it was acquired by the state in 1990 and opened in March 1991.

Golf

Laredo has three 18-hole golf courses: the Laredo Country Club, the Casa Blanca Golf Course. and Laredo's newest course Max A. Mandel Municipal Golf Course. The golf course has a rating of 74.6, a slope rating of 133, and has a par of 72. The country club was designed by Joseph S. Finger and was opened in 1983. The golf course has a rating of 72.5, a slope rating of 125, and has a par of 72. The golf course was designed by Leon Howard and was opened in 1967.
The golf course has a par of 72. The golf course was designed by Robert Trent Jones II Golf Course Architects and was opened in 2012.

Parks, recreational centers, plazas, and baseball fields

The City of Laredo owns eight recreational centers, thirty-four developed parks, twenty-two undeveloped parks or under construction, five baseball fields, and four plazas.

David B. Barkley Plaza

A memorial honoring the forty-one Hispanic soldiers who have received the Medal of Honor was built in Laredo, Texas in 2002. The plaza was named after the only Laredo Medal of Honor recipient David B. Barkley. The David B. Barkley Plaza has a bronze statue of David B. Barkley and an American flag measuring 100 ft by 50 ft and is 308 ft tall making it the tallest flagpole in the United States.

City of Laredo Shiloh Trail

This mountain bike trail is approximately 4 miles of single-track dirt trails, widening occasionally to double-track. Some technical parts make this trail challenging, but not impossible, for beginners. Thorny shrubs and cacti are the predominant vegetation. The trail is well-marked and improvements continue to be made. The trail is located off Shiloh Road at the end of Livingston Road.

Government

Municipal government

The Laredo city government is a strong city council – weak mayor system. The mayor presides over the eight-member city council, but only votes to break a tie. City Council elections are based on single-member districts and campaigns have no party affiliations. Municipal elections are now held in November (formerly in May) of even-numbered years. The municipal government is administered by the city manager hired by the city council. All city elected offices have a four-year term and are nonpartisan though most officials have a Democratic party preference or affiliation.

City council meetings are held on Mondays and can be viewed on the public-access television cable TV channel or live online at Public Access Channel live stream.

The current mayor, Pete Saenz, was elected in 2014 to succeed his fellow Democrat, the term-limited Raul G. Salinas. In his bid for a second term, Salinas had in 2010 defeated then city council members Jose A. Valdez Jr., and Gene Belmares. Salinas also failed in a bid to unseat Webb County treasurer Delia Perales in the Democratic runoff election held on May 27, 2014.

In 2015, the city council named Jesus R. "Chuy" Olivares (born c. 1959) as the city manager to succeed the retiring Carlos Villarreal. Olivares was paid just over $249,000 annually, which included a car and telephone allowance. He was formerly the city manager of Eagle Pass in Maverick County. On May 15, 2017, Olivares suddenly retired as city manager when he became a target of an ongoing Federal Bureau of Investigation probe into widespread public corruption in Webb County. Olivares claims thirty-eight years of municipal experience in Laredo (where was formerly the parks director), Austin, and Eagle Pass. Mayor Saenz expressed support for the decision as one of mutual convenience for Olivares and the city. The council then named the assistant city manager, Horacio De Leon, as the acting city manager. Robert Alexander Eads was selected as City Manager on March 4, 2020,

City council members receive a monthly gross salary of $1,000 plus $750 monthly for maintaining a home office, $150 per month for a city cell phone, and $750 monthly for fuel expenses. The annual total compensation is hence $31,800.

On August 1, 2014, then city councilman Jorge A. Vera was arrested on a felony drug possession charge. He was accused of having earlier in the week offered cocaine to an off-duty agent of the United States Border Patrol and her friends outside a Laredo restaurant. First elected to the council in 2012, Vera faced a state jail felony (possession of a controlled substance) and a Class B misdemeanor (filing a false report). Vera was subsequently indicted on both charges by a grand jury of the Texas 406th Judicial District Court. His arraignment was in the 49th District Court. Because Vera did not resign from the city council, a recall election was held on November 4, 2014. By a wide margin, voters in District VII supported Vera's recall. Attorney George Altgelt won the special election to succeed Vera.

In March 2017, Ray Garner resigned after four years as the chief of the Laredo Police Department. He instead returns to his former position as police chief of the United Independent School District. Then city manager Jesus Olivares appointed Captain Gabriel E. Martinez Jr., a 30-year veteran of the department, as the acting police chief to succeed Garner.

State and federal representation
The United States District Court for the Southern District of Texas Laredo division is a relatively new building adjacent to the Webb County Courthouse.

The United States Border Patrol Laredo Sector Headquarters is at 207 W. Del Mar Blvd, Laredo, Texas.

The United States Postal Service operates its main Post Office at 2700 East Saunders Street south of Laredo International Airport. Postal branches are downtown and at 2395 East Del Mar Boulevard.

The Texas Army National Guard armory is at 6001 E. Bob Bullock Loop 20 Laredo, Texas.

The Colburn Memorial United States Army Reserve Center is at 1 W End Washington St, Laredo, Texas.

The Texas Department of Criminal Justice (TDCJ) operates the Laredo Parole Office.

The private prison operator GEO Group runs the Rio Grande Detention Center in Laredo, which opened in 2008 and holds a maximum of 1900 federal detainees.

In March 2014, it was reported Laredo and Webb County have a child abuse rate at nearly double the state average. In 2012–2013, 515 child clients were served by the Children's Advocacy Center in Laredo, 105 for physical abuse and 360 for sexual abuse. Statewide, 9.3 percent of children have been victims of physical abuse, but in Laredo the rate is 17 to 21 percent. A special investigator for Child Protective Services said he now sees two to three cases per day of such inflictions.

Education

Elementary and secondary

Two school districts, the Laredo Independent School District and the United Independent School District, and eight private schools serve Laredo.

The Laredo Independent School District (LISD) serves the areas in central Laredo. The LISD high schools are Cigarroa High School, Martin High School, J. W. Nixon High School and the Laredo Early College High School. LISD also has three magnet schools: Dr. Dennis D. Cantu Health Science Magnet School, LISD Magnet for Engineering and Technology Education, and Vidal M. Trevino School of Communications and Fine Arts.

The United Independent School District serves the rest of Laredo and northern Webb County. The UISD high schools are John B. Alexander High School, Lyndon B. Johnson High School Laredo Early College High School, United High School, and United South High School. UISD has three magnet schools: John B. Alexander Health Science Magnet, United Engineering Magnet, and the United South Business Magnet. There are thirty-nine schools within UISD and more are under construction or development. United ISD is one of the state's fastest growing districts, serving almost forty thousand students and covering an area the physical size of Rhode Island.

Several private schools also serve the city:
 Saint Augustine High School, Catholic school, 9th–12th
 Laredo Christian Academy, Assemblies of God, Grades PK–12th
 United Day School, PK–8th
 Mary Help of Christians School, Catholic school, PK–8th
 Blessed Sacrament School, Catholic school, PK–7th
 Our Lady of Guadalupe School, Catholic school, PK–6th
 St. Peter Memorial School, Catholic school, PK–6th
 Saint Augustine School, Catholic school, now elementary and middle, PK–8th, established 1928, enrollment 485 (2008)

The city also has several charter schools, including:
 Gateway Academy K–12

Colleges and universities
Laredo is home to Laredo College and Texas A&M International University (TAMIU). The University of Texas Health Science Center at San Antonio has a campus in Laredo.

Laredo College is a two-campus institution which offers two-year Associate's degrees. The main campus is at the western end of downtown Laredo near the Rio Grande, on the site of the former Fort McIntosh. This fort played a major role in the development of Laredo, as it protected the community from Indian raids in its early history. Several of the old buildings at the fort were converted into classrooms, but after renovation programs nearly all of the campus structures are now modern. The smaller, newer second campus, Laredo College South Campus, is in south Laredo along U. S. Route 83.

The Texas A&M International University is a 4/6-year university that offers bachelor's and master's degrees. On April 22, 2004, the Texas Higher Education Coordinating Board in Austin, Texas approved Texas A&M International University to grant its first PhD in International Business Administration. TAMIU's College of Business Administration has been named an outstanding business school in The Princeton Review's "Best 282 Business Schools", 2007 Edition, and ranked third in the nation for the category: "Greatest Opportunity for Minority Students." The university's campus is in Northeast Laredo along Loop 20. The university was an extension of Texas A&I-Kingsville and later the former Laredo State University. Prior to its current location along Bob Bullock Loop 20, the university was housed with the Laredo College downtown campus.

The University of Texas Health Science Center campus is in East Laredo near U.S. Highway 59 and the Laredo Medical Center. The campus is an extension university from UTHSC in San Antonio, Texas. The university offers doctoral degrees in the medical and dental fields.

Media

Newspapers

Television
According to Nielsen Media Research, the Laredo region (which includes Webb and Zapata counties) is ranked 185th market by population size in the United States. The first station to broadcast in Laredo was KGNS in 1956, followed by KVTV in 1973, then KJTB (now KLDO) in 1985.

The only notable television network missing from Laredo's airwaves is PBS. Laredo had a full-power local The CW affiliate, KGNS-DT2, but on July 3, 2014, the affiliation switched to ABC. Prior to that KJTB channel 27, from January 1985 to October 1988 was Laredo's ABC affiliate. KJTB was later bought by Entravision and affiliated the station to Telemundo and changed its callsign to KLDO. Today KLDO is affiliated to Univision. Before KJTB, KGNS, an NBC affiliate had a secondary affiliation to ABC from its founding in 1956 through KJTB's founding in 1985. On November 6, 2013, KGNS reached an agreement to add the ABC affiliation. The ABC affiliate launched in July 2014 when KGNS dropped The CW programming and added ABC programming. In October 2015 KVTV now KYLX started broadcasting The CW Programming on its digital subchannel 13.2.

In December 2014, all Nuevo Laredo stations turned off analog television broadcasting and started broadcasting digitally only.

Radio
According to Arbitron, the Laredo region (which includes Jim Hogg, Webb, and Zapata counties) is ranked 191st market by population size.

AM radio

Long range AM stations
The following Clear Channel AM stations can be heard in Laredo:

FM radio

PR:Suspected pirate radio stations since they are not licensed with Federal Communications Commission (FCC) in the United States or COFETEL in Mexico. Some pirate stations are suspected, due to the fact other licensed stations nearby share the same frequency, such as 106.5 Radio Voz and KMAE from nearby Bruni, Texas and 103.3 Radio 33 and XHAHU-FM from nearby Anáhuac, Nuevo León, each city less than 50 miles from Laredo.

Infrastructure

Health care

In addition to the University of Texas Health Science Center branch, there are five other principal medical centers in Laredo: the Laredo Medical Center, Doctor's Hospital, Gateway Community Health Center, Providence Surgical & Medical Center, and the Laredo Specialty Hospital.

Doctors Hospital is Laredo's second-largest medical center. Affiliated with Universal Health Services, it is on Loop 20 in north Laredo. The Doctors Regional Cancer Treatment Center offers comprehensive cancer services.

The Providence Surgical & Medical Center is an ambulatory health care center in north-central Laredo and also owned by Universal Health Services.

The Gateway Community Health Center is the third-largest medical center in Laredo. The Medical center moved to its new $11,000,000 building in 2006. The main Gateway Community Health Center is in East Laredo, close to U.S. Highway 59. It also has three branches in the Laredo area: the South Clinic, El Cenizo Community Center, and Quad City Community Center.

Gateway Community Health Center services include:

The Laredo Specialty Hospital is the fourth-largest medical center in Laredo. It is owned by Ernest Health Inc. and was founded by Elmo Lopez Jr. on May 22, 2006. It admitted its first patient within hours of operation. The grand opening took place in March 2007.

Transportation
In 2016, 82.3 percent of working Laredo residents commuted by driving alone, 10.2 percent carpooled, 0.9 percent used public transportation, and 1.9 percent walked. About 2 percent of working Laredo residents commuted by all other means, including taxi, bicycle, and motorcycles. About 2.6 percent worked at home.

In 2015, 6.5 percent of city of Laredo households were without a car, which decreased slightly to 5.9 percent in 2016. The national average was 8.7 percent in 2016. Laredo averaged 1.85 cars per household in 2016, compared to a national average of 1.8 per household.

Air

Laredo is served by the Laredo International Airport. Daily flights are available to Houston (George Bush Intercontinental Airport) and to Dallas/Fort Worth International Airport. Tri-weekly flights to Las Vegas, Nevada are available. After Laredo Air Force Base closed in the mid-1970s, the federal government handed over the old air force base and property to the City of Laredo for a new municipal airport. From the mid-1970s until the mid-1990s, the airport used a small terminal for passenger airline service and several old hangars for air cargo and private aircraft. A new state-of-the art passenger terminal was built along the then newly constructed Loop 20 to accommodate larger jets and to increase passenger air travel through Laredo. Expansion of air cargo facilities, taxiways and aprons, air cargo carriers such as DHL, FedEx, UPS, BAX, and others have responded by adding commercial air cargo jet services. Laredo also has two medical helipads, at Laredo Medical Center and Doctor's Hospital.

Mass transit
El Metro is the public transit system that operates in the city with 21 fixed routes and Paratransit services, with approximately 4.6 million passengers per year. El Metro works with a fleet of over 47 fixed route buses, 2 trolleys and 18 Paratransit/El Lift vans. The El Metro hub is in downtown Laredo at El Metro Transit Center. The center also houses Greyhound Lines and provides fee-based daily parking for downtown shoppers and workers.

Rural transit
Rural transportation is provided by the Webb County operated "El Aguila Rural Transportation" (the Eagle) bus services. El Aguila serves fixed daily routes from rural communities (Bruni, El Cenizo, Mirando City, Oilton, and Rio Bravo) to the downtown El Metro Transit Center.

International bridges

Gateway to the Americas International Bridge
Juárez-Lincoln International Bridge
World Trade International Bridge (commercial traffic only)
Colombia-Solidarity International Bridge
Texas-Mexican Railway International Bridge

Major highways
Major highways in Laredo and their starting and ending points:
 Interstate 35 Laredo-Duluth
 Interstate 69W Laredo-Victoria following I-69 to Port Huron
 Interstate 2 is proposed to be extended to Laredo following US 83. If it is extended, I-2's terminus would be I-69W. It would also serve as the southern end of I-35.
 U.S. Highway 59 Laredo-Lancaster. Included on the I-69W corridor.
 U.S. Highway 83 Brownsville-Laredo-Westhope
 State Highway 255 Laredo-Colombia
 State Highway 359 Laredo-Skidmore
 State Loop 20 Loop around Laredo
 Farm to Market Road 1472 Laredo – Colombia Solidarity International Bridge

Major highways in Nuevo Laredo and their starting and ending points:
 Mexican Federal Highway 85 Nuevo Laredo-Mexico City
 Mexican Federal Highway 2 Matamoros-Nuevo Laredo-Colombia-Ciudad Acuña
Tamaulipas State Highway 1 Nuevo Laredo-Monterrey
Nuevo León State Highway Spur 1 Colombia-Anáhuac

Notable people

Born in Laredo

 Pedro "Pete" Astudillo, composer
 David Barkley-Cantu, first Mexican-American to be awarded the Medal of Honor
 Freddie Benavides, former professional baseball player
 Santos Benavides, Confederate States of America colonel
 Esther Buckley (1948–2013), member of the United States Commission on Civil Rights from 1983 to 1992; Laredo educator
 Kaleb Canales (born 1978), assistant coach of the Indiana Pacers of the National Basketball Association
 Quico Canseco, Republican U.S. Representative representing Texas's 23rd congressional district from 2010 to 2012
 Orlando Canizales, professional boxer, Career W 50 L 5 D 1
 Francisco G. Cigarroa, chancellor of University of Texas System
 Henry R. Cuellar, Democrat U.S. Representative from Texas's 28th congressional district since 2005, former Texas Secretary of State (2001) and state representative (1987–2001)
 Tony Dalton, actor and screenwriter
 Elizabeth De Razzo (born 1980), actress
 Tom DeLay, former U.S. Representative for Texas's 22nd congressional district, former House Majority Leader, Republican from Sugar Land, Texas
 Ramón H. Dovalina (born 1943), educator; president of Laredo Community College from 1995 to 2007
 Elma Salinas Ender (born 1953), first Hispanic woman state court judge in Texas; served on the 341st District Court from 1983 until her retirement in 2012
 Audrey Esparza (born 1986), actress
 Megan Frazee (born 1987), women's professional basketball player, (2009–)
 Betty Flores (born 1944), first woman mayor of Laredo, 1998–2006
 Alfonso Gomez-Rejon (born 1973), film and television director
 Carla Gonzalez (born 2001), professional wrestler known as Rok-C and Roxanne Perez
 Armando Hinojosa (born 1944), sculptor, designed Tejano Monument in Austin and "Among Friends There Are No Borders" at the Laredo International Airport
 Jovita Idar (1885–1946), was a Mexican-American journalist, political activist and civil rights worker, who fought for the rights of Mexican Americans and women
 John King, Professional baseball pitcher for The Texas Rangers
 Rodney Lewis (born 1954), oil and natural gas industrialist based in San Antonio
 Sebastián Ligarde (born 1954), actor
 Thomas C. Mann (1912–1999), Pointman for Latin America policy for President Lyndon Johnson.
 Jose C. "Pepe" Martin Jr. (1913–1998), mayor of Laredo from 1954 to 1978; convicted federal felon popularly known as el patron
 César A. Martínez (born 1944), artist, prominent in the Chicano world of art
 Alicia Dickerson Montemayor, Democratic political activist and educator
 Amado Maurilio Peña Jr. (born 1943), American visual artist and art educator
 Federico Peña, former mayor of Denver, former U.S. Secretary of Transportation, and former U.S. Secretary of Energy, Democrat
 William Merriweather Peña (1919–2018), architect
 Roel Ramírez (born 1995), professional baseball player
 Ana Rodriguez, Miss USA finalist, finished third runner up, 2011
 Johnny Rodriguez, Tex-Mex Country singer
 Pete Saenz (born 1951), mayor of Laredo since November 12, 2014; former trustee of Laredo Community College and Laredo lawyer
 Poncho Sanchez (born 1951), conga player, Latin jazz bandmaster & salsa singer
 Antonio R. "Tony" Sanchez Jr., oilman and banker, 2002 Democratic nominee for governor of Texas
 José Silva, parapsychologist
 Edgar Valdez Villarreal (born 1973), nicknamed La Barbie, Mexican-American drug lord and former leader of Los Negros
 Kathleen King von Alvensleben, architect
 Peggy Webber (born 1925), actress
 Jack Wheeler (1944–2010), co-founder of the Vietnam Veterans Memorial Fund; aide to U.S. Presidents Reagan, George H.W. Bush, and George W. Bush
 Judith Zaffirini (born 1946), First Latina elected to the Texas State Senate.

Other notable people

 Steve Asmussen (born 1965), horse breeder who won three legs of the Triple Crown
 Norma Elia Cantú (born 1947), Chicana postmodernist writer and a professor of English at the University of Texas at San Antonio
 Thomas Haden Church, actor in film Sideways and sitcom Wings
 Edmund J. Davis (1827–1883), governor of Texas from 1869 to 1873; resided in Laredo during parts of the 1850s
 Ned Kock, information systems professor affiliated with Texas A&M International University
 Jack Lanza, ex-professional wrestler, now WWE producer
 Juan L. Maldonado (born 1948), sixth president of Laredo Community College
 Saul N. Ramirez Jr., mayor of Laredo from 1990 to 1998
 Richard Peña Raymond, state representative from Webb County since 2001; previously represented Duval County
 Jerry D. Thompson (born 1943), historian affiliated with Texas A&M International University
 Jeremy Vuolo, (born 1987), is an American former soccer player for Major League Soccer and the North American Soccer League.
 Robert G. Whitehead (1916–2007), businessman/artist who marketed "Blue Star" first-aid ointment
 Roger L. Worsley (born 1937), president of Laredo Community College, 1985 to 1995

Sister cities
During the month of July, Laredo sponsors the Laredo International Sister Cities Festival, which was founded in 2003. The festival is an international business, trade, tourism, and cultural expo. All of Laredo's sister cities are invited to participate. In 2004, the Laredo International Sister Cities Festival received the best overall Program award from the Sister Cities International.

Laredo's sister cities are:

 Acámbaro, Mexico (2004)
 Campeche, Mexico 
 Cerralvo, Mexico
 Chenzhou, China (2001)
 Ciénega de Flores, Mexico (1987)
 Ciudad Valles, Mexico
 La Cruz, Costa Rica
 Cuernavaca, Mexico
 General Escobedo, Mexico
 General Terán, Mexico 
 Guadalajara, Mexico
 Guadalupe, Mexico (2000)
 Los Herreras, Mexico
 Hutt, New Zealand 
 Jerez, Mexico (1987)
 Lampazos de Naranjo, Mexico (2000)
 Laredo, Spain (1978)
 Lázaro Cárdenas, Mexico
 León, Mexico
 Mexticacán, Mexico (2002)
 Monclova, Mexico (2003)
 Montemorelos, Mexico
 Murray Bridge, Australia (1984)
 Nuevo Laredo, Mexico (1986)
 Papantla, Mexico 
 San Antonio de Areco, Argentina
 San Miguel de Allende, Mexico (2001)
 Tainan, Taiwan 
 Tepatitlán de Morelos, Mexico
 Tijuana, Mexico
 Tlahualilo, Mexico (1988)
 Tonalá, Mexico
 Torreón, Mexico 2004)
 Veracruz, Mexico (1992)
 Wenzhou, China
 Wuwei, China (2004)
 Zixing, China (2002)

See also

Laredo–Nuevo Laredo
Nuevo Laredo
Webb County, Texas

Notes

References

Bibliography

External links

City of Laredo Homepage
Laredo Chamber of Commerce
Laredo Convention and Visitors Bureau
Laredo Development Foundation

Laredo History provided by the City Of Laredo
Historic Photos from the Laredo Public Library hosted by the Portal to Texas History

 
Cities in Webb County, Texas
County seats in Texas
Laredo–Nuevo Laredo
Divided cities
Mexico–United States border crossings
Capitals of former nations
Former colonial and territorial capitals in the United States
Populated places established in 1755
1755 establishments in New Spain
Cities in Texas
Texas populated places on the Rio Grande